Jackson Township is one of the twenty-two townships of Knox County, Ohio, United States.  The 2010 census found 988 people in the township.

Geography
Located in the southeastern corner of the county, it borders the following townships:
Butler Township - north
Newcastle Township, Coshocton County - northeast corner
Perry Township, Coshocton County - east
Fallsbury Township, Licking County - south
Eden Township, Licking County - southwest corner
Clay Township - west
Harrison Township - northwest corner

No municipalities are located in Jackson Township, although the unincorporated community of Bladensburg lies on the western border with Clay Township.

Name and history
Founded in 1815, it was named for Andrew Jackson, and it is one of thirty-seven Jackson Townships statewide.

Government
The township is governed by a three-member board of trustees, who are elected in November of odd-numbered years to a four-year term beginning on the following January 1. Two are elected in the year after the presidential election and one is elected in the year before it. There is also an elected township fiscal officer, who serves a four-year term beginning on April 1 of the year after the election, which is held in November of the year before the presidential election. Vacancies in the fiscal officership or on the board of trustees are filled by the remaining trustees.

References

External links
County website

Townships in Knox County, Ohio
Townships in Ohio